The F. A. Chadbourn House is located in Columbus, Wisconsin.

Description
The site is a wood-sided home and carriage house, designed by Van Ryn & DeGelleke and built in 1900. F.A. and his family were involved in the First National Bank of Columbus, and Chadbourns built four nearby houses.

References

Houses on the National Register of Historic Places in Wisconsin
National Register of Historic Places in Columbia County, Wisconsin
Houses in Columbia County, Wisconsin
Tudor Revival architecture in Wisconsin
Sandstone houses in the United States
Houses completed in 1900